María de los Ángeles Muñoz Rodríguez, known by her stage name La Panchita, was a Mexican singer.

She took her stage name from the song of the same name by Joaquín Pardavé. She began her career singing rancheras, but after a tour of South America, she brought new songs to her repertoire, such as the Peruvian waltz "Nube gris". In the 1940s and 1950s, she recorded many songs for the Peerless and RCA Víctor labels, with the Mariachi Vargas de Tecalitlán.

She married the Ecuadorian ventriloquist Paco Miller. She died on 8 November 2014 in Monterrey, Nuevo León, Mexico.

Partial discography

Peerless 
 "La pajarera" (1947)
 "Sabe Dios" (1947)
 "Decepcionado" (1947)
 "La rejega" (1947)
 "Dos luceros" (1948)
 "Las tres "efes"' (1948)
 "El aburrido" (1948)
 "El sauce y la palma" (1948)

RCA Víctor 
 "Corazón, no te rajes" (1951)
 "Nube gris" (1951)
 "Estrellita del sur" (1952)
 "El buque fantasma" (1952)
 "La campesina" (1952)
 "En mi pensamiento" (1952)
 "Mi aventura" (1952)
 "Alma, corazón y vida" (1953)
 "Corazón, ¿por qué?" (1953)
 "Corazón" (1953)
 "Nuestro amor" (1953)
 "Desafío" (1954)
 "Los dos perdimos" (1954)
 "Arrieros somos" (1955)
 "El andariego" (1955)
 "La casita blanca" (1955)

Musart 
 "Mis noches sin ti"
 "Nube gris" (second version)
 "Si nos dejan"
 "Alma, corazón y vida" (second version)
 "Dime adiós sin llorar"
 "Verdad amarga"
 "Extráñame"
 "Bella sultana"
 "Materia"
 "Estrellita del sur" (second version)
 "Por qué, Dios mío"
 "Destino amargo"
 "Así paso"
 "Hazme morir"
 "Vida vacía"
 "Peligro"
 "Gota a gota"
 "Flor encantada"
 "El roble"
 "Lamparita"

Filmography 
 La liga de las canciones (1941)

References

External links 
 

Ranchera singers
2014 deaths
20th-century Mexican women singers